Diego Hidalgo y Durán (1886–1961) was a Spanish intellectual and politician, who was appointed minister of war during the Second Spanish Republic (1931–1936).

Biography
Born in Los Santos de Maimona (Extremadura) in a family of aristocratic descent, Diego Hidalgo had to make a living early as his family had no lands and his father died when he was young. After studying law, he passed the state exam to become a notary, and started supporting his mother and four siblings.

Hidalgo was a Republican (even though he had rights to two titles of Marquis, given up by his grandfather, Diego Hidalgo y Solís). One of the drafters of the Constitutions of the Second Spanish Republic in 1931, and a member of the Radical Republican Party presided by Alejandro Lerroux, Hidalgo became Minister of War in 1934. When serving as Minister, Hidalgo chose Francisco Franco (who was later going to be lead nationalist Spain during the civil war and be the caudillo for nearly 40 years) as one of his advisers. Hidalgo ordered Franco to stop the asturian miners' strike of 1934. Although Franco would later reveal to be ideologically different from Hidalgo, he kept affection for him, and Hidalgo was one of the only people who could speak freely with Franco.

During the Spanish Civil War (1936–1939), Diego Hidalgo had to flee from Spain, where he was threatened both by Nationalists and Republicans. He spent most of the war in France where he married Gerda Schnur, the daughter of German industrialist David Schnur.

Back in Spain in 1938, Hidalgo continued his activities as a lawyer, notary, and writer. Notably, he saved 39 Republican political prisoners from being executed, proving their innocence. Hidalgo was also a member of the International Court of Justice.

Diego Hidalgo y Durán was the father of the Spanish intellectual and philanthropist Diego Hidalgo Schnur.

Major writings by Diego Hidalgo y Durán
Un notario español en Rusia, 1929.
¿Por qué fui lanzado del ministerio de la guerra?: diez meses de actuación ministerial, 1934.
, 1947.
José Antonio de Saravia: de estudiante extremeño a general de los ejércitos del Zar, 1936.

Notes

References
Books on Diego Hidalgo y Durán
Alvarez Junco (J.), Espadas Burgos (M.), Lopez (E.), Muñoz Tinoco (C.), Diego Hidalgo: Memoria de un tiempo difícil Alianza Editorial, Madrid, 1986.
Muñoz Tinoco, Concha. Diego Hidalgo : un notario republicano / Concha Muñoz Tinoco. Badajoz : Departamento de Publicaciones, Diputación Provincial, 1986.

1886 births
1961 deaths
People from Zafra-Río Bodión
Radical Republican Party politicians
Government ministers of Spain
Members of the Congress of Deputies of the Second Spanish Republic
Politicians from Extremadura
20th-century Spanish lawyers
Exiled Spanish politicians
Government ministers during the Second Spanish Republic